Sixpence None the Richer (also known as Sixpence) is an American Christian alternative rock band that formed in New Braunfels, Texas, and eventually settled in Nashville, Tennessee. They are best known for their songs "Kiss Me" and "Breathe Your Name" and their covers of "Don't Dream It's Over" and "There She Goes". The name of the band is inspired by a passage from the book Mere Christianity by C. S. Lewis.

The band received two Grammy Award nominations, Best Pop Performance by a Duo or Group with Vocals for "Kiss Me" and Grammy Award for Best Rock Gospel Album for Sixpence None the Richer (1997).

History

Origin of the band's name
Vocalist Leigh Nash described the origin of the band's name on the Late Show with David Letterman:

Formation and early years (1992–1996)
Guitarist/songwriter Matt Slocum met Leigh Nash in the early 1990s. They recorded a demo, which circulates as "The Original Demos", with bassist T.J. Behling at Verge Music Works recording studio in Dallas, and eventually an album, The Fatherless and the Widow, for the independent label REX Music in 1993. After adding more members, the band toured in support of The Fatherless and The Widow. The band released This Beautiful Mess in 1995.

Into the mainstream (1997–2004)
In 1997, the group signed to Steve Taylor's label Squint Entertainment and released a self-titled album, which slowly began garnering attention from a wider audience in the mainstream industry. 

In 1998, "Kiss Me" was released as a single, propelling Sixpence None the Richer into the national pop spotlight.  The next year, the band followed up "Kiss Me" with a cover of The La's' "There She Goes". Sixpence appeared on the Late Show with David Letterman, The Tonight Show with Jay Leno, and numerous morning talk shows. 

The band had a follow-up album ready to release, but their label Squint Entertainment started to fall apart, leaving the band in limbo for several years. Finally, Squint Entertainment folded and that album, Divine Discontent, was released in October 2002.

On February 26, 2004, Matt Slocum announced that the group had disbanded.

Reunion and Lost in Transition (2007–present) 
In November 2007, Sixpence None the Richer reunited. They released the EP My Dear Machine on the website NoiseTrade in 2008, the band's first official release since The Best of Sixpence None the Richer in 2004. 

In October 2008, they released a Christmas album titled The Dawn of Grace.

Sixpence signed to Credential Recordings and played a headline slot at the 2009 Greenbelt Festival in the UK. According to Nash, the band began recording a new album in January 2010. The album, Lost in Transition, was released on August 7, 2012.

On November 12, 2016, the band performed at the Love Love Rock Festival in Taipei, Taiwan, playing the hits "Don't Dream It's Over", "Kiss Me" and "There She Goes".

Band members
Current members
 Leigh Nash – vocals (1992–2004, 2007–present)
 Matt Slocum – guitar, cello (1992–2004, 2007–present)
 Justin Cary – bass (1997–2004, 2008–present)
 Rob Mitchell – drums (2001–2004, 2012–present)

Former members
 T.J. Behling – bass (1992–1993)
 Mark Couvillion – guitars (1992–1993)
 Tess Wiley – guitars, vocals (1994–1996, 2008)
 Dale Baker – drums (1993–2001)
 James Arhelger – bass (1993–1994)
 Joel Bailey – bass (1994) also in Society's Finest
 J.J. Plasencio – bass (1995–1997)
 Sean Kelly – guitars (1997–2004)
 Jerry Dale McFadden – keyboards (2001–2004)
 Jason Lehning – keyboards (2012–2013)

Timeline

Discography

 The Fatherless and the Widow (1994)
 This Beautiful Mess (1995)
 Sixpence None the Richer (1997)
 Divine Discontent (2002)
 The Dawn of Grace (2008)
 Lost in Transition (2012)

Awards and nominations

References

American pop music groups
Christian rock groups from Texas
Alternative rock groups from Texas
Musical groups established in 1992
Musical groups disestablished in 2004
Musical groups reestablished in 2007
Musical groups from New Braunfels, Texas
Musical groups from Nashville, Tennessee
1992 establishments in Texas
2004 disestablishments in Texas
2007 establishments in Texas
Credential Recordings artists
Reprise Records artists
Female-fronted musical groups